Archidactylina is a genus of copepods that contains only the species Archidactylina myxinicola, and is the only genus in the family Archidactylinidae. It is a parasite of the gill pouches of two species of hagfish found in Japanese waters, Eptatretus okinoseanus and Myxine garmani.

References 

Siphonostomatoida
Monotypic crustacean genera